This is a list of Ugandan musicians and musical groups.

A
 Allan Toniks
 A Pass
 Afrigo Band
 Angella Katatumba
 Angela Kalule
 Aziz Azion

B

 Babaluku
 Bataka Squad
 Bebe Cool
 Benon Mugumbya
 Bobi Wine
 Bosmic Otim

C
 Chris Evans
 Cinderella Sanyu
 Chosen Becky

D
 David Lutalo
 Desire Luzinda
 DJ Shiru

E
 Eddy Kenzo
 Elly Wamala

F
 Fik Fameica
 Fille Mutoni
 Frank Mbalire
 Fred Masagazi
 Fresh Kid Uganda

G
 Gabriel K
 Giovanni Kiyingi
 Geoffrey Oryema
 Gravity Omutujju
 Goodlyfe Crew
 Grace Nakimera

H
 Halima Namakula
 Henry Tigan

I
 Irene Ntale
 Iryn Namubiru
 Isaiah Katumwa

J
 Jackie Akello
 Jackie Chandiru
 Janzi Band
 Jemimah Sanyu
 Jimmy Katumba
 Joanita Kawalya 
 Jose Chameleone
 John Blaq
 Judith Babirye
 Julie Mutesasira
 Juliana Kanyomozi

K
 Klear Kut

L
 Levixone
 Leila Kayondo
 Lilian Mbabazi
 Lydia Jazmine
 Lumix Da Don

M
 Mad Ice
 Mariam Ndagire
 Madoxx Ssemanda Sematimba
 Maro 
 Maurice Kirya
 Master Blaster
 Milege
 Michael Ross Kakooza
 Moses Matovu

N
 Navio
 Nick Nola
 Nince Henry

P
 Paulo Kafeero
 Papa Cidy
 Pallaso
 Philly Lutaaya
 Peter Miles
 Phina Mugerwa
 Producer Hannz

R
 Rachel K
 Ray G
 Rema Namakula
 Rachael Magoola
 Ragga Dee
 Radio and Weasle
 Ruyonga

S
 Sam Gombya
 Saba Saba aka Krazy Native
 Ssewa Ssewa
 Sera
 Sheebah Karungi
 Sophie Gombya
 Sister Charity
 Spice Diana
 St. Nelly-Sade
 Stecia Mayanja
 Suzan Kerunen
 Sylver Kyagulanyi

T
 The Mith
 Tshila

U
 Undercover Brothers Ug

V
 Vampino
 Viboyo
 Veronica Lugya (Vinka)

W
 Wilson Bugembe

Z
 GNL Zamba

References

Ugandan
Musicians
Kumusha